The 1933–34 Elitserien season was the seventh season of the Elitserien, the top level ice hockey league in Sweden. Eight teams participated in the league, and Hammarby IF won the league championship.

Final standings

External links
 1933-34 season

Elitserien (1927–1935) seasons
1933–34 in Swedish ice hockey
Sweden